Trethowan's sign is when Klein's line does not intersect the lateral part of the superior femoral epiphysis on an AP radiograph of the pelvis.

Clinical use
Trethowan's sign is indicative of a diagnosis of slipped capital femoral epiphysis.

See also
 Southwick angle

References

External links

Musculoskeletal radiographic signs